Gregorio Blasco Sánchez (10 June 1909 – 31 January 1983), also known as Goyo Blasco, was a Spanish footballer who played as a goalkeeper.

Personal life
Born in Mundaka in the Basque Country , Blasco emigrated to Mexico where he married Maria Victoria González in 1943 and with whom he had 3 children, Gregorio, José Maria and Victoria.

Career
Blasco began his career in 1926 when he joined Acero de Olabeaga. Two years later he signed for Athletic Bilbao where his first match was a friendly against Swansea City. During his time with Athletic Bilbao he won the Ricardo Zamora Trophy three times, and also played 5 times for the Spanish national team. He played with Athletic Bilbao until the outbreak of the Spanish Civil War in 1936 when all national competitions in Spain were put on hold. In 1937, in the midst of the civil war, he was selected for the Basque Country national football team which was sent abroad to raise funds for refugees fleeing the conflict. In 1938 that team integrated into the Mexican league under the name Club Deportivo Euzkadi.  After one season the team dissolved and Blasco joined Real Club España. In 1941 he joined River Plate in Argentina, before returning to Mexico a year later to rejoin Club España. He stayed there until 1947 when he joined rival team Atlante. He was one of the first goalkeepers to use goalkeeping gloves.
Apart from being a footballer he also had a business selling construction materials.

References 

1909 births
1983 deaths
Footballers from the Basque Country (autonomous community)
Spanish footballers
Spain international footballers
La Liga players
Liga MX players
Athletic Bilbao footballers
Atlante F.C. footballers
Club Atlético River Plate footballers
Real Club España footballers
Association football goalkeepers
Expatriate footballers in Argentina
Expatriate footballers in Mexico
Spanish expatriate footballers
Spanish expatriate sportspeople in Argentina
Spanish expatriate sportspeople in Mexico
Spanish emigrants to Mexico
Basque Country international footballers